North Somerset is a unitary authority in the ceremonial county of Somerset, England. In the United Kingdom, the term listed building refers to a building or other structure officially designated as being of special architectural, historical or cultural significance; Grade I structures are those considered to be "buildings of exceptional interest". Listing was begun by a provision in the Town and Country Planning Act 1947. Once listed, severe restrictions are imposed on the modifications allowed to a building's structure or its fittings. In England, the authority for listing under the Planning (Listed Buildings and Conservation Areas) Act 1990 rests with Historic England, a non-departmental public body sponsored by the Department for Digital, Culture, Media and Sport; local authorities have a responsibility to regulate and enforce the planning regulations.

North Somerset constitutes part of the ceremonial county of Somerset. As a unitary authority, North Somerset is administered independently of the non-metropolitan county of Somerset. Its administrative headquarters are located in the town hall of Weston-super-Mare. North Somerset includes areas that were once part of Somerset before the creation of Avon in 1974.

There are 37 Grade I listed buildings in North Somerset, including the Clifton Suspension Bridge, which joins North Somerset to Bristol and Clevedon Pier. Of the listed buildings, manor houses include Clevedon Court, built in the 14th century, and from the 15th century, Ashton Court and Nailsea Court. Somerset has many religious structures; the largest number are from the Norman or medieval eras. Some of the churches are included in the Somerset towers, a collection of distinctive, mostly spireless Gothic church towers.

Buildings

|}

See also
 List of Grade I listed buildings in Somerset
 List of towers in Somerset
 Grade II* listed buildings in North Somerset

Notes

References

External links

 
Lists of Grade I listed buildings in Somerset